Boston University East station is a surface-level light rail station on the MBTA Green Line B branch located in Boston, Massachusetts. The station is located in the center median of Commonwealth Avenue, between Granby Street and the east end of Cummington Street, surrounded by the Boston University campus. It consists of two side platforms, which serve the B branch's two tracks.

History

Owing to its location in front of Warren Towers dormitory and Boston University's College of Arts and Sciences, Boston University East has the sixth-highest ridership of any station on the B branch. In the early 2000s, the MBTA modified key surface stops with raised platforms for accessibility. Construction at Boston University Central and Boston University East was part of a $32 million modification of thirteen B, C, and E branch stations.  During construction, an interim station with temporary platforms between the two stops was used. Construction began on March 18, 2002, a week behind schedule due to delays in finishing up similar work at Harvard Avenue and Washington Street. The project was then expected to be completed within six months.

However, poor weather and limited work periods (as most work could only be done during the four hours at night that no trains used the line) delayed the completion date first to December 2002, then March 2003. The contractor informed the MBTA in early 2003 that they would be unable to complete the work; a new contractor was chosen in mid-2003, but work did not resume until September. The stations were completed and reopened on November 18, 2003.

References

External links

MBTA – Boston University East Station
Google Maps Street View: Granby Street entrance, Cummington Street entrance

Green Line (MBTA) stations
Railway stations in Boston
Railway stations in Massachusetts at university and college campuses
Railway stations in the United States opened in 1894